Fenia Chertkoff de Repetto (7 October 1869 – 31 May 1927) was a Russian-born Argentine feminist, intellectual, educator, political activist, and sculptor. She was married to Nicolás Repetto, an Argentine physician and leader of the Socialist Party of Argentina.

Early years
Chertkoff was born in Odessa, in the Kherson Governorate of the Russian Empire (present-day Ukraine) in 1869. Her sister, Mariana, was the first wife of argentine socialist party founder, Juan B. Justo; and Adela, who married the socialist theorist, Adolfo Dickman. In 1887, she graduated as a teacher from a school in her hometown; she studied music, theater and dance. Because of her political involvements, she was forced into exile with her family. Chertkoff was invited to the University of Lausanne, Switzerland, where she specialized in pedagogy between 1897 and 1898, completing her studies at the Sorbonne a year later. She married the socialist Gabriel Gukovsky, with whom she had a daughter, Victoria Gucovsky, before he died in Europe.

In Argentina, she lived at Santa Clara, a colony established by Eastern European Jews, where she founded a school and developed a library. Chertkoff and her sisters became citizens of that country. She moved to Buenos Aires where she lived in the Dickman home before she married Nicolas Repetto, a member of the Socialist Party. In 1903, he participated as a delegate in Congress of the Socialist Party, which proposed, among other issues, gender equality, equality before the law for legitimate and illegitimate children, the enactment of divorce law, and paternity investigation. A Socialist, she co-founded the Socialist Women's Center in 1920, and the Trade Union of Women, with her sisters and Gabriela Laperriere and Rachel Messina. She participated in the first strikes of the workers and the trade union organization of workers in different industries, such as telephone, textiles, trade, and factories, contributing to enact laws for making Sunday a day of rest. She also denounced labor exploitation of minors, poor sanitary conditions in factories, and long working hours. In poor health for her last 20 years, she died in Buenos Aires in 1927, at the age of 59.

References

Further reading 

https://web.archive.org/web/20110710131557/http://buenos-aires.idoneos.com/index.php/Calles_de_Puerto_Madero#Fenia_Chertkoff 
 Recorrido histórico por colonias judías del centro de Entre Ríos. Diario El Día (20 January 2008) 
 Partido Socialista Auténtico. Fenia Chertkoff - Datos biográficos 

1869 births
1927 deaths
Odesa Jews
People from Odessky Uyezd
Emigrants from the Russian Empire to Argentina
Argentine feminists
Argentine educators
Argentine women educators
Argentine women sculptors
Jewish feminists
Jewish women sculptors
Naturalized citizens of Argentina
Socialist feminists
20th-century Argentine sculptors
20th-century Argentine women artists
20th-century Argentine artists
19th-century Argentine sculptors
19th-century Argentine women artists